Sayyid Mahmoud al-Hasani al-Sarkhi  (born 1964) is a prominent Iraqi  Shia Marja'. He was known for his opposition to US and Iranian interference in Iraq.

He has studied in seminaries of Najaf, Iraq under Grand Ayatollah Mohammad Mohammad Sadeq al-Sadr.

Biography
Mahmood Al-Sarkhi Al-Hasani was born in Baghdad in 1964. He was raised in the confines of his father and from the very early of his age, he was fond of scientific books. He finished primary and secondary school in his hometown. He entered the college of engineering civil department University of Baghdad and he graduated in 1987.

Controversy
Al-Sarkhi is a very controversial figure in Iraq. His opponents accuse him of holding unorthodox views on religious matters as well as ascribing to himself higher religious credentials and position than he actually possesses. He was arrested multiple times by the police.
His many beliefs are against Shia Islam. So, opponents do not consider him a real Shia.   Unlike other Shias he considers azadari and construction of shrines on graves as biddah. As per his opinion the number of Imams is not fixed. But Islam Naab does not accept it.

See also
 Abu al-Qasim al-Khoei
The Grand Ayatollah Sayyid Ali Hussaini al-Sistani

Notes

External links
البيــانــات
نسب المرجع الديني السيد محمود الحسني الصرخي
مواضيع هامة للمرجع الديني السيد محمود الحسني الصرخي 

1964 births
Living people
Iraqi Shia Muslims